Jacques Herbert Kupfermann (1926–1987) was an American Expressionist painter who was born in Vienna, Austria. His work, both abstract and figurative, divides into several distinct periods, reflecting both his early influences and later lengthy sojourns in countries as far apart as Mexico and Norway. Renowned for his portraits as well as landscapes, his subjects include many eminent figures. His distinctive use of impasto, the typically Expressionist love of the paint itself and rich earth colours, are perhaps some of the defining features of his work – as are his love of bleak Northerly scenery, the combination of delicacy and vibrant movement discernible in his still-life subjects, and an aura of tenderness and serenity even where a certain turbulence seems to lurk beneath the surface. Though he resisted making any obvious political or sociological statements in his work, it is not difficult to see how his early years in Vienna with all its uncertainty, daily threats and background violence, might have influenced his later paintings.

His talent was discernible at a very early age. It both provided some escape and release from what was going on all around him and literally acted as a lifeline,  as it was his art teacher who helped him  escape the country and the fate suffered by his parents. Elias and Mina (née Feuermann), who remained in Vienna, were later to be deported and killed in Minsk, Belarus. His father, Elias, had been a self-taught lawyer and inventor; his mother, Mina, a governess to a minor Austrian Royal. He had one sister, Frederika, who fled Vienna for Palestine, making her way via Scandinavia, in the early 1940s. The celebrated cellist Emanuel Feuermann was his mother's cousin.

Early years 

Though the family were far from wealthy, it was a cultured household where poetry and art were encouraged, and Goethe and Schiller part of the very air he breathed.  Jacques’ early childhood in Vienna had been filled with trips to the Natural History Museum, the Prater, and carefree summers spent fishing and rambling at the summer home they shared with other family members in Poland. His enduring love of mountain and woodland landscapes stemmed very much from those days. All this was to end with the Anschluss when he, as a Jew, was forced to leave school and to daily witness (and often endure) the beatings on the street and other acts of brutality that were commonplace.

Kupfermann was born to Jewish parents who had migrated from an area of Austria-Hungary that had become part of Poland. Because he was born in Austria he was able to get a visa to the US, but his parents were not. His getting a visa at all largely came because his art teacher valued his artistic ability and wanted to help him.

Jacques finally managed to leave Vienna as a 13-year-old in April 1940, making the hazardous journey by train across occupied Europe to the Netherlands alone where he was to pick up the SS Volendam to the United States. The Germans invaded the Netherlands only a month after Jacques arrived and it was nothing short of miraculous that he managed to board the ship and make his escape before Rotterdam was bombed.

But once in America, his life was not entirely a happy one. Speaking little English, the young refugee arrived carrying a letter from his parents. It was a letter that he was to keep with him for the rest of his life. In it, they begged for a few hundred dollars to enable them, too, to leave Austria to escape what they already saw as the writing on the wall. But as a fairly helpless and unwelcome child, he was unable to raise even this small amount (though realistically there is no way of knowing if it would have helped at this late stage, even though the Germans were releasing some Jews in exchange for money). For the rest of his life, Jacques was to live with what he saw as a terrible failing on his part, as well as his memories of the unsympathetic relatives who treated him as more of an unwelcome burden than a valued addition to the family.

Unsurprisingly, with his parents now feared deported or worse, his teen years in the Bronx, NY were troubled ones and after a minor misdemeanour Jacques was sent to a corrective facility in Engelwood, New Jersey for delinquent boys where, happily, he lighted upon the man who turned his life around – psychologist Dr Abe Kraig who ran the facility with his wife. Dr Kraig virtually adopted Jacques, and recognising his talent, encouraged him to apply for a scholarship to The High School of Music & Art in New York, which he was awarded. At that time, Jacques, however, had one overriding desire: he wanted to volunteer as a G.I. and fight – and above all, to return to Vienna to establish the fate of his parents. At the end of the war he was sent as a paratrooper to Northern Italy. He spent one year in Italy and when he finally did return to Vienna after the war, he discovered that neighbours had denounced his parents and that they had then been rounded up and deported  on one of the transports to the East. His disillusionment with the Viennese was such that he vowed never to return, and never did.

Returning to the States, Jacques studied at the Art Students League of New York with Yasuo Kuniyoshi, whose colour theories exerted an important influence on his later style.
At the end of the 1940s, he briefly joined his sister in newly established Israel working for the IDF, helping to build the town of Eilat. There followed a somewhat restless period where he travelled extensively, in-between studying at the Académie de la Grande Chaumière, Paris and State Academy, Norway. He famously made one trip round Europe on a motorbike with a little sidecar attached for his beloved basset-beagle hound, Sam. He lived and painted in Mexico for a few years, and lived for a few years in Norway whose glacial and brooding scenery helped establish his unique style and palette. He was to develop the same sort of relationship with the harsh landscapes of Maine, where he would retreat for a few months to a remote hunting camp every year as a woodland guide.

Marriage, Woodstock and England 

Jacques married Jeannette (née Weitz), an English anthropologist and writer, in 1964. They met in New York on a blind date set up by the cartoonist Robert Grossman and his wife Donna. At that time, Jeannette was working as research librarian for the Wenner-Gren Foundation for Anthropological Research, while studying at Columbia University for her master's degree. It was love at first sight with Jacques proposing on their second date and Jeannette accepting. They married a few months later in London. On their return to the States they moved to Woodstock, New York –  then a renowned artist's colony – and their son Elias was born in nearby Kingston in 1965.

For a while they kept homes in both Woodstock and London, where their second child Mina was born (1967), but finally settled in England in 1970, moving from London to a large Regency house in Maidenhead where Jacques had his studio.

In 1974 Jacques held his first one-man exhibition in the UK at the Thackeray Gallery, Kensington and he continued to exhibit in the US mainly in New Orleans, Princeton and Woodstock, drawing much inspiration from the North Cornish coastline. In 1972 the couple bought a small fisherman's cottage in Port Isaac as a holiday home and base for Jacques’ painting.

As well as his affinity to the bleak grandeur of Cornwall, Jacques grew to love the more gentle Thames valley and riverside vistas and his own garden, full of unruly foliage, giant poppies and wild marguerites, provided an ever-changing landscape which he drew upon often.

By the time Jacques became ill in the 1980s, he had also built up a solid reputation as a fine portrait painter with his portraits exhibiting many of the same distinct characteristics as his landscapes, now exhibited extensively throughout the world.

He had also, in the 1950s, designed ballet sets for the Princeton ballet – notably for Coppélia and Under Milk Wood, though only a few photographs survive of these. A great ballet-lover, he was to form a close friendship with the renowned ballet designer Nicholas Georgiadis in the 1970s.

A keen member of the Chelsea Arts Club, he would spend much time meeting friends there towards the end of his life.

It was perhaps an apt symbol that 1987, the year of his death, was also the year of the worst hurricane the UK had ever seen, uprooting many old and magnificent trees. The tree had always had a very special meaning for Jacques as borne out by so many of his paintings – perhaps something to do with their enduring strength, their ever-changing light and shade, their rootedness, their solitary nature – very much characteristics of Jacques himself.

The paintings  

OFFICIAL PURCHASES AND PUBLIC COLLECTIONS:
Museum of Modern Art. U.S.A.
Columbus Museum, U.S.A.
Montclair Museum, U.S.A.
Kalamazoo Art Institute U.S.A.
Newark Museum, U.S.A. 
Pennsylvania Academy, U.S.A.
Academy of Norway

ONE-MAN EXHIBITIONS:

Jacques Seligmann Gallery, New York, 1965
Little Gallery, Princeton, 1954/56/58
Munson Gallery, New Haven 1963/67
Kalamazoo Museum 1958
Z.O.A House, Tel-Aviv 1960
Woodstock Gallery, New York, 1966
Downtown Gallery, New Orleans, 1961/64/73
Gallery 100, Princeton 1972/75
Gallery Vincitore, Brighton 1973
Brunel University 1977
Thackeray Gallery, London 1974/76/78/82/84/86
Mall Galleries London: Royal Society of Portrait Painters, 1984/86
Galerie Richard, Kusnacht, Switzerland, 1987

References

20th-century American painters
American male painters
American Expressionist painters
1987 deaths
1926 births
Artists from Vienna
People from the Bronx
People from Woodstock, New York
The High School of Music & Art alumni
Austrian emigrants to the United States
20th-century American male artists